The following is a list of characters for The WB teen television drama series, Dawson’s Creek (1998–2003). The series was created by Kevin Williamson and follows the lives of a group of close-knit friends who live in the fictional New England town of Capeside, Massachusetts. 

The first season featured eight regular characters: the titular Dawson Leery (James Van Der Beek); Dawson's childhood friend Joey Potter (Katie Holmes); new girl in town Jen Lindley (Michelle Williams); Pacey Witter (Joshua Jackson), Dawson's other best friend; Gail Leery (Mary-Margaret Humes), Dawson's mother; Mitch Leery (John Wesley Shipp), Dawson's father; Bessie Potter (Nina Repeta), Joey's older sister; and Evelyn "Grams" Ryan, Jen's grandmother (Mary Beth Peil). In season two, siblings Jack (Kerr Smith) and Andie McPhee (Meredith Monroe) joined the series as recurring characters and became part of the main cast in subsequent seasons; though Andie was not present for season five, she appeared as a guest in season six. In season five, Audrey Liddell (Busy Phillips) was introduced as Joey's college roommate and became a recurring character that season, joining the main cast in season six.

Main characters

Recurring characters 
The following is a list of characters that were recurring guests on the series; they are listed in the order that they first appeared on the show. Some characters have had story lines that spanned multiple seasons, while others are restricted to arcs that occurred during a single season of the show.

Notable guest appearances 

 Melissa McBride as Nina in "Road Trip" and Melanie "In All Good Things..."
 Mel Harris as Helen Lindley in "Guess Who's Coming to Dinner"
 Julie Bowen as Aunt Gwen in "Stolen Kisses"
 Danny Roberts as Jean-Jean in "Coming Home"
 Jane Lynch as Mrs. Witter in "The Te of Pacey"
 Pat Hingle as Irv the Mechanic in "Eastern Standard Time"
 Andy Griffith as Andrew Lanier in "A Winter's Tale"
 Eddie Cahill as Max Winter in "Everything Put Together Falls Apart"
 Ray Wise as Roger Stepavich in "All the Right Moves"
 Seth Rogen as Bob in "Rock Bottom"
 Paul Gleason as Larry Newman in "Sex and Violence"

Special cameo appearances 

 No Doubt as themselves in "Spiderwebs"
 Adam Carolla as himself in "Lovelines"
 Dr. Drew Pinsky as himself in "Lovelines"

References 

Dawson's Creek
Dawson's Creek
Dawson's Creek